"Head over Heels (In This Life)" is the first CCM-only single from Switchfoot's sixth studio album, Oh! Gravity.. According to the All Access Music Group's official website, it was released on September 4, 2007 to Christian AC Radio. It was later picked up by Christian CHR and Christian Rock radio formats.

This also marked the first single release after Switchfoot's split with their major label Columbia/Sony BMG, although it was released by the band's resident Christian Music distributor, Sparrow Records, not by the band itself, nor its fledgling record label, lowercase people records. It was not impacted to mainstream radio.

Chart performance
 In its first week, the song was "Most Added" on Christian Hit Radio.
 The single debuted on the CHR charts at #30 on September 28, 2007, eventually peaking at No. 4.
 The song was No. 1 on the CHR Recurrents chart.
 The song peaked at #22 on the Billboard Hot Christian Songs chart.

References

External links
Listen to the full song

2007 singles
Switchfoot songs
Songs written by Jon Foreman
Song recordings produced by Steve Lillywhite
2006 songs
Sparrow Records singles